Bethel Church is a Mennonite Brethren Church in rural Yale, South Dakota, a member of the Central District of the Mennonite Brethren Church. Their mission statement is "Working together for growing God's family, a place where integrity is honored, training is valued, compassion is expected, and outreach is emphasized."

History
Bethel church was founded in 1904. In 1920, they built a new building and incorporating the original church building In 1953, Bethel donated a building to James Valley Christian School to start out on. Bethel is one church near Lake Byron. In 2005 the congregation built the present building at a cost of $1,000,000 and paid off the building note a few years later.

Pastors
1902-1910: John Z. Kleinsasser
1908-1948: John Tschetter
1912-1941: Jacob M. Tschetter
1919-1929: Rev. Jacob P. Glanzer
1911-1915: Rev. Samuel J. R. Hofer
1935-1944: Rev. Samuel J. R. Hofer
1944-1947: Rev. A. K. Wiens
1947:      Rev. Eli L. Hofer
1947-1952: Rev. John H. Kleinsasser
1952-1953: Rev. Paul Bartel
1953-1960: Rev. George Classen
1962-1965: Rev. Laverne Hofer
1965-1966: Rev. Menno Pullman
1966-1969: Rev. John B. Guenter
1969-1977: Rev. Ron Seibel
1978-1995: Rev. Elton Berg
1995-1999: Gary Janzen
2000-2004: Rev. Tom Cartney
2004-2005: Vacant, weekly speaker
2005-2007: Rev. Ernie Lambright
2007-2008: Interim Pastor: Ray Shepard
2008–2012: Jeremiah Betron
2012–Present: Coalt Robinson

References

 A history of Bethel Mennonite Brethren Church (1902–1979)
 Bethel Church's Centennial book (1979–2004)

Churches in South Dakota
Churches in Beadle County, South Dakota
German-Russian culture in South Dakota
Mennonitism in South Dakota
Russian Mennonite diaspora in the United States